The Tirnaskea Formation is a geologic formation in Northern Ireland. It preserves fossils dating back to the Ordovician period.

See also

 List of fossiliferous stratigraphic units in Northern Ireland
Geography of Ireland
Ireland

References
 

Ordovician Northern Ireland
Ordovician southern paleotemperate deposits
Ordovician southern paleotropical deposits